Xenophrys takensis, also known as the Tak horned toad, is a species of frog in the family Megophryidae from Tak Province, Thailand.

References

takensis
Endemic fauna of Thailand
Amphibians of Thailand
Amphibians described in 2011